Hutin is a French surname meaning "the quarreler" and may refer to:

Charles Francois Hutin (1715–1776), French painter
Christian Hutin (born 1961), French politician
Hutin Britton (1876–1965), English actress
Madeleine Hutin (1898–1989), better known as Little Sister Magdeleine of Jesus, French nun
Serge Hutin (1927–1997), French author
Louis X of France (1289–1316) was called "Le Hutin"
Hutin is also a small settlement of about 100 people, part of Krašić in Croatia